Siimar is an Estonian surname. Notable people with the surname include:

Kristofer Siimar (born 1998), Estonian tennis player
Mattias Siimar (born 1998), Estonian tennis player
Veiko Siimar (born 1941), Estonian swimmer

Estonian-language surnames